The 2016 County Championship Plate, also known as Bill Beaumont Cup Division 2, was the 15th version of the annual English rugby union, County Championship organised by the RFU for the tier 2 English counties. Each county drew its players from rugby union clubs from the third tier and below of the English rugby union league system (typically National League 1, National League 2 North or National League 2 South). The counties were divided into two regional pools (north/south) with four teams in each and the winners of each pool meet in the final to be held at Twickenham Stadium. New counties to the division included Kent and Durham County who were relegated from the 2015 Bill Beaumont Cup while Leicestershire were promoted as the winners of the 2015 County Championship Shield.

At the end of the pool stage, pool winners East Midlands (north) and Kent (south) met in the final at Twickenham. Despite it being their first final against regulars Kent, East Midlands won 33-27, with former Tongan international, Maama Molitika, scoring three tries in the game. He would finish as the competition's top try scorer.

Competition format
The competition format is two regional group stages divided into north and south, with each team playing each other once. This means that two teams in the pool have two home games, while the other two had just one. The top side in each group goes through to the final held at Twickenham Stadium, with both teams also being promoted to the top tier for the following season. Typically there was no relegation although teams have dropped out/been invited to join the division.

Due to changes to the County Championships to be implemented for the 2017 competition, four teams instead of two would be promoted to the top tier. This meant that the two group winners would be joined by two other teams from the plate competition based on how well they have done over the past couple of seasons.

Participating Counties and ground locations

Group stage

Division 2 North

Notes

Round 1

Round 2

Round 3

Division 2 South

Notes

Round 1

Round 2

Round 3

Final

Total season attendances
Does not include final at Twickenham which is a neutral venue and involves teams from all three county divisions on the same day

Individual statistics
 Note that points scorers includes tries as well as conversions, penalties and drop goals.  Appearance figures also include coming on as substitutes (unused substitutes not included).  Statistics will also include final.

Top points scorers

Top try scorers

See also
 English rugby union system
 Rugby union in England

References

External links
 NCA Rugby

2016
2015–16 County Championship